Vishambhar Singh Yadav (born 1 January 1955) is a Samajwadi Party politician in India. He is second term member of legislative assembly for Baberu in the Uttar Pradesh.

Early life and background 

He was born in a small village named Paprenda, in the district of Banda, in Baberu, Uttar Pradesh, India, where his father Maheshwari Singh Yadav was a landlord. He studied in Dayanand Anglo Vedic Degree College, Kanpur and gained a master's degree in arts from Kanpur University, Kanpur. He is married to Rama Yadav, with whom he has three sons Vivek, Varun and Gaurav. He is an advocate, agriculturist, politician and social worker.

Political career 

Vishambhar Singh Yadav started his career as a student leader of DAV college Kanpur and became president of DAV college. He became a member of  Uttar Pradesh legislative assembly two times in 2007, 2012 and 2022 from Baberu, Banda seat.

References

External links
 Personal page on party site

Samajwadi Party politicians
People from Banda district, India
1955 births
Living people
Uttar Pradesh MLAs 2022–2027
Samajwadi Party politicians from Uttar Pradesh